Valentin Marius Lazăr (born 21 August 1989) is a Romanian professional footballer who plays as a midfielder for Liga III side CS Păulești.

Club career

2013-2014 season 
In the summer of 2013, Lazăr signed a contract for three years with FC Dinamo București. He made his debut on 19 July in a match against Poli Timișoara. He scored his first goal in a match against Chindia Târgoviște in the Romanian Cup and a second goal against FC Brașov. In 2014, he scored against Corona Brașov and two goals against Săgeata Năvodari in Liga I. He scored and assisted against big rival Steaua in the Romanian cup. Lazăr ended the 2013–2014 season with 6 goals and 11 assists in all competitions.

2014-2015 season 
On 20 July Lazăr became the new captain after Laurențiu Rus was released from Dinamo. In the first match against Chiajna in the League Cup Lazăr scored a goal. In a match against Universitatea Cluj, Lazăr scored a goal to put Dinamo 2-1 ahead and assisted for 3–1. In the match against Concordia Chiajna Lazăr was sent off in the 76th minute.

2015-2016 season 
In September, Lazăr was loaned to Concordia Chiajna. After four months, the technical director of Dinamo București announced that he was called back from his loan.

Honours

Club
Dinamo București
Cupa României runner-up : 2015–16

CSM Reșița
Liga III: 2021–22

Individual
DigiSport Liga I Player of the Month: October 2016

External links 

1989 births
Living people
Sportspeople from Ploiești
Romanian footballers
Association football midfielders
FC Petrolul Ploiești players
FC Sportul Studențesc București players
FC Dinamo București players
CS Concordia Chiajna players
Al-Sailiya SC players
Al Kharaitiyat SC players
Ümraniyespor footballers
Al-Shahania SC players
CSM Reșița players
Liga I players
Liga II players
Liga III players
Qatar Stars League players
TFF First League players
Qatari Second Division players
Expatriate footballers in Qatar
Expatriate footballers in Turkey
Romanian expatriate sportspeople in Qatar
Romanian expatriate sportspeople in Turkey